Janfida, is a village in the Armavir Province of Armenia near the Armenia–Turkey border.

History

See also 
Armavir Province

References 

World Gazeteer: Armenia – World-Gazetteer.com

Populated places in Armavir Province